Edward Harris may refer to:

 Edward Harris (North Carolina judge) (1763–1813), lawyer, politician, and judge
 Edward Harris (ornithologist) (1799–1863), introduced the Percheron horse to America; associate of John James Audubon; amateur naturalist 
 Edward Harris (Royal Navy officer) (1808–1888), British naval commander, diplomat and politician
 Edward Francis Harris (1834–1898), New Zealand public servant, interpreter, landowner and genealogist
 Edward Harris, 4th Earl of Malmesbury (1842–1899), son of the above
 Edward A. Harris (1910–1976), American journalist and Pulitzer Prize winner
 Edward Harris (archaeologist), archaeologist and director of the Bermuda Maritime Museum
 Edward Harris (Rhode Island politician) (1801–1872), wool manufacturer, abolitionist, temperance supporter, and philanthropist
 Edward F. Harris (1909–?), American politician in the state of Washington
 Edward Harris (Irish judge) (1575–1636), English born judge and politician
 Eddie Harris (1934–1996), jazz musician
 Eddie Harris (footballer) (1879–1966), Australian rules footballer
 Ed Harris (born 1950), American actor
 Ed Harris (politician)  (born c. 1964), San Diego city councilman
 Ed Harris (playwright)

See also
 Ted Harris (disambiguation)
 James Edward Harris, 2nd Earl of Malmesbury (1778–1841), British peer
 Dud Harris, American football player born 1903